Riffgat (also known as Borkum Riffgat and OWP Riffgat) is an offshore wind farm  to the north-west of the German island of Borkum and north of the eponymous shipping channel in the southern North Sea. It consists of 30 turbines with a total capacity of 108 megawatt (MW), and is expected to generate enough electricity for 112,000 households.

Early 2011, the Dutch government stated that the wind farm was partly in Dutch territory and protested against the issuing of construction licenses by the German government. The issue was resolved in 2014 with the signing of the Ems-Dollart-Treaty.

Between November 2015 and April 2016, transmission problems prevented Riffgat from exporting power.

See also 

Wind power in Germany
List of Offshore Wind Farms

References

External links
 Riffgat Offshore Windpark

Wind farms in Germany
Offshore wind farms in the North Sea
Borkum
2014 establishments in Germany
Energy infrastructure completed in 2014